Awino Okech is a Kenyan academic, based at the University of London's School of Oriental and African Studies (SOAS), where her "teaching and research interests lies in the nexus between gender, sexuality and nation/state making projects as they occur in conflict and post-conflict societies". Okech has also taught at the African Leadership Centre, based at King's College London, and is a member of the editorial advisory board of Feminist Africa.

Early life
Awino Okech grew up in Kisumu Kenya, where her mother was an educator. Okech has a bachelor's degree in Political Science from the University of Nairobi, Kenya, followed by a master's degree and a PhD from the African Gender Institute at the University of Cape Town.

Career
Okech taught at the African Leadership Centre, based at King's College London, where she was the co-convener of the Gender Leadership and Society module, which formed part of the MSc in Security, Leadership and Society.

Okech is now based at the University of London's School of Oriental and African Studies (SOAS), in the Centre for Gender Studies, where her "teaching and research interests lies in the nexus between gender, sexuality and nation/state making projects as they occur in conflict and post-conflict societies".

Okech is a member of the editorial advisory board of Feminist Africa, a peer-reviewed journal from the African Gender Institute, based at the University of Cape Town. Okech is a member of the African Security Sector Network, a pan-African scholars and policy advocates network focused on security sector reform.

Selected publications
Okech's publications include:
 Women and Security Governance in Africa, ed. Funmi Olonisakin & Awino Okech. Oxford: Pambazuka Press, 2011.  
 Gendered security: Between ethno-nationalism and constitution making in Kenya (2013) * Dealing with Asymmetrical Conflict: Lessons from Kenya (2015)
 Boundary Anxieties and Infrastructures of Violence: Exploring Somali Identity in Post-Westgate Kenya (forthcoming)
 Protest and Power: Gender, State and Society in Africa (forthcoming)

References

Living people
Kenyan feminists
University of Cape Town alumni
Academics of King's College London
Kenyan expatriates in the United Kingdom
Feminist studies scholars
Kenyan women writers
21st-century Kenyan women writers
Academics of SOAS University of London
Year of birth missing (living people)